The Egypt Basketball Cup is an annual knockout competition for Egyptian basketball teams. The competition was established in 1975,  it is organised by the Egyptian Basketball Federation.

List of winners

Titles by club

Most Valuable Players

References

External links 
 Egyptian Basketball Cup 2018, goalzz.com.

Basketball competitions in Egypt